is a former Japanese football player and manager.

Playing career
Ejiri was born in Shizuoka Prefecture on July 12, 1967. After graduating from Meiji University, he joined Japan Soccer League club Furukawa Electric (later JEF United Ichihara) in 1990. He played many matches as offensive midfielder from first season and the club won the 2nd place 1990 JSL Cup. In 1992, Japan Soccer League was folded and founded new league J1 League. He played as regular player and also served a captain from 1996. The club won the 2nd place 1998 J.League Cup. He retired end of 1998 season.

Coaching career
After retirement, Ejiri became a coach for JEF United Ichihara (later JEF United Chiba) in 1999. He mainly served as coach for top team. In 2005, he moved to Albirex Niigata and became a coach under manager Yasuharu Sorimachi (2005) and Jun Suzuki (2006). In 2007, he became a coach for Japan U-23 national team under manager Sorimachi and participated in 2008 Summer Olympics.

In 2009, Ejiri returned to JEF United and became a coach under manager Alex Miller. However the club performance was bad and manager Miller was sacked in July 2009. Ejiri became a manager as Miller successor. Although Ejiri managed in 15 matches, the club won only one match and finished at bottom place in the season. The club was relegated from the division 1 first time in the club history. Although he also managed in 2010 season, the club could not return division 1 and he resigned end of 2010 season.

On 18 March 2019, he was appointed manager once again, after the departure of argentine Juan Esnáider. He left his position at the end of 2019 season.

Club statistics

Managerial statistics
Update; November 25, 2019

References

External links
 
 
 

1967 births
Living people
Meiji University alumni
Association football people from Shizuoka Prefecture
Japanese footballers
Japan Soccer League players
J1 League players
JEF United Chiba players
Japanese football managers
J1 League managers
J2 League managers
JEF United Chiba managers
Association football midfielders